Hassan Khan Mohammad (born 6 September 2000) is a Hong Kong cricketer. In November 2019, he was named in Hong Kong's squad for the 2019 ACC Emerging Teams Asia Cup in Bangladesh. He made his List A debut for Hong Kong, against India, in the Emerging Teams Cup on 18 November 2019. Later the same month, he was named in Hong Kong's squad for the Cricket World Cup Challenge League B tournament in Oman.

In February 2020, he was named in Hong Kong's Twenty20 International (T20I) squad for the 2020 Interport T20I Series against Malaysia. He made his T20I debut for Hong Kong, against Malaysia, on 24 February 2020. Prior to his international debut, he had also previously played for the Hong Kong Under-19 National cricket-team at the 2018 ACC Under-19 Asia Cup and the Asian Cricket Council's Eastern Region tournament in July 2019.

References

External links
 

2000 births
Living people
Hong Kong cricketers
Hong Kong Twenty20 International cricketers
Place of birth missing (living people)